Moitalel Mpoke Naadokila (born 8 February 2001) is a Kenyan athlete who competes in the 400m hurdles.

From Nairobi, he competes for Texas A&M University and was the 2017 World Under-18 400m hurdles silver medallist. In 2019, while at South Plains College, he achieved NJCAA All-American honors placing third in the 400m hurdles running 51.12. Then, in 2020 he was the NJCAA National Champion in the 600m and 800m. In May 2021 he achieved qualification for the delayed 2020 Tokyo Olympics  as he clocked 48.89 seconds to win the 400m hurdles during the South Eastern Conference Outdoor Championships at the E.B Cushing Stadium in Texas. In doing so he became the first athlete in the history of Texas University to run a sub 49 seconds in the 400m hurdles. However, unfortunately for Naadokila he was unable to compete at the Olympics as he had not been part of the dope testing programme expected from an athlete from the Kenyan federation.

References

2001 births
Living people
Kenyan male hurdlers
Sportspeople from Nairobi
Junior college men's track and field athletes in the United States
Texas A&M Aggies men's track and field athletes